Shamsabad (also Romanized as Shamsābād; also known as Shams Abad Roodbal) is a village in Bakhtajerd Rural District, in the Central District of Darab County, Fars Province, Iran. At the 2006 census, its population was 843, in 191 families.

References 

Populated places in Darab County